Sargaya (Harğaya) is a rural locality (a village) in Kulganinsky Selsoviet, Burzyansky District, Bashkortostan, Russia. The population was 146 as of 2010. There are 4 streets.

Geography 
Sargaya is located 50 km northeast of Starosubkhangulovo (the district's administrative centre) by road. Yaumbayevo is the nearest rural locality.

References 

Rural localities in Burzyansky District